The following is a list of telenovelas produced by Televisa from the years 1960 to 1969.

1960

1961

1962

1963

1964

1965

1966

1967

1968

1969

References 

 1960s
Televisa 1960s
Mexican television-related lists